The Vlaams Economisch Verbond (VEV) is a Flemish employers' organization and lobbying group. 

The main objectives of the organization were the development of the Flemish economy and to improve the status of Flemish as a business language in Flanders. It is an important partner of the Flemish government on business in Flanders, and also participates in the Socio-economic Council of Flanders.

History 
It was founded in 1908, by among others Lieven Gevaert as the Vlaamsch Handelsverbond, to create a Flemish counterpart of the Federation of Belgian Enterprises, and it became the VEV in 1926.

From 1971 to 1993, René De Feyter was the managing director of the VEV.

In 2004, VEV formed an alliance with the Flemish Chambers of Commerce and Industry (CCI's) to create . Today, there are still eight Voka - Chambers of Commerce and Industry (CCI) in Flanders (West Flanders, East Flanders, Antwerp-Waasland, Kempen, Mechelen, Halle-Vilvoorde, Leuven and Limburg). Together with the VEV, these eight CCI's form the Voka-Alliance, the largest Flemish network of enterprises.

This 'Voka-Alliance' unites more than 17,000 businesses from all sectors within the Flemish region. The alliance is politically independent; there is no structural funding from government. It is a non-profit organisation: small, medium and large-sized companies of all sectors everywhere in Flanders can become member on a voluntary basis.

See also
 Agoria
 Brussels Enterprises Commerce and Industry (BECI)
 De Warande (Club)
 Economy of Belgium
 Flanders Investment and Trade (FIT)
 League of Christian Employers
 UEAPME
 UNIZO
 Walloon Union of Companies
 Prince Albert Fund

References

Further reading
 Ludo Meyvis, Markt en Macht - Het VEV van 1926 tot heden, Tielt, Lannoo, 2004

External links
 voka.be

Labor relations organizations
Trade associations based in Belgium
Economy of Belgium
Employers' organizations
1926 establishments in Belgium
Flanders
Organizations established in 1926